WB1200, also known as 1200 Stewart, is a future twin skyscraper complex in the Denny Triangle neighborhood of Seattle, Washington, United States. The project is located at the intersection of Stewart Street and Denny Way and comprises 1,014 apartments and retail space in two 48-story buildings. The retail space, housed in a three-story podium with an indoor galleria, is planned to feature a music venue and a Boeing 747-400 fuselage. It began construction in 2018 and is scheduled to be completed in late 2023.

History

The triangular site at 1200 Stewart Street, occupied by a mix of single-story businesses and parking lots also facing Denny Way and Minor Avenue, has been proposed as the site of a residential high-rise since the late 2000s by several developers. Lexas Companies submitted a proposal in 2007 to build a pair of 36-story mixed-use towers with condominiums and a hotel over a retail podium. The project, designed by architect Paul Thoryk, was to include 300 condominiums ranging from studio units to three-bedroom residences, a 250-room hotel, and a large fitness club. The tower was also proposed as the home of the College Club of Seattle, which had vacated its former building in Downtown Seattle, but negotiations later fell through.

Lexas had planned to begin construction in 2010, but progress was hindered by the search for a major financial investor amid the economic recession. The city government granted a master-use permit to Lexas for the project in 2012 with a four-year expiration date. The Westbank Corporation of Vancouver submitted a revised design to the city in September 2015, proposing a pair of 38-story towers with 892 residential units without a hotel. The company purchased the triangular project site for $52.8 million in October and unveiled a "wave-like design" by Henriquez Partners Architects a month later.

In September 2016, the city government approved a revised master-use permit for the project, which would comprise two 45-story towers with 1,050 total residential units above a retail podium and 736 parking stalls in an underground garage. The permit was later modified to add four stories of residential units with a $10 million fee paid into the city's mandatory housing affordability fund. Construction began in May 2018 under general contractor Graham Construction. Graham and Westbank were later accused by subcontractors of failure to pay for labor or supplies. Progress was also delayed by the COVID-19 pandemic, a regional concrete workers strike, and other issues. Graham is expected to step down from the project in late 2022 and will be replaced by Icon West Construction. The project is planned to be completed in late 2023.

Design

WB1200 occupies a triangular lot bound to the north by Denny Way, to the east by Yale Avenue, to the south by Stewart Street, and to the west by Minor Avenue. It is located adjacent to Interstate 5 in the northeast corner of the Denny Triangle neighborhood. The podium will have a two-story music venue operated by Live Nation, a Trader Joe's grocery store, and other retailers. The fuselage was purchased from a scrapyard in California and was formerly part of the United Airlines fleet from 1990 to 2017.

The residential towers, designed by Henriquez Partners Architects, will have sculpted balconies that are shaped into a "wave-like" facade inspired by the Aqua skyscraper in Chicago. The balconies, mainly concentrated on the north side of the towers, will have gardens and trees to create a "sensual form". The residential towers will also have a rooftop patio, a dog park, and a swimming pool. The complex will have 613 total parking stalls in a four-story underground garage accessed from Minor Avenue, with commercial and retail spaces separate from those for residential use.

References

Buildings and structures under construction in the United States
Denny Triangle, Seattle
Residential skyscrapers in Seattle
Twin towers
Modernist architecture in Washington (state)